Yunus al-Katib al-Mughanni was a well-known musician and writer on music in the first half of the 2nd/8th century. He was the son of a jurist (faqih) of Persian origin and a mawla (non-Arab, Muslim freedman or client) of the family of al-Zubayr ibn al-Awwam. Beside music, he was also a famous poet.

‌Biography
He was born and grown up in Medina. Since he was a scribe in local divan, he became known as "al-katib". But soon he became interested in music and took lessons from Ma'bad, Ibn Suraydi, Ibn Muhriz, al-Gharid and Muhammad ibn Abbad al-katib. During a trip to Syria at the time of Caliph Hisham ibn Abd al-Malik, his fame on music brought him the patronage of Caliph al-Walid II. This event is mentioned in the book of One Thousand and One Nights in 684th and 685th nights.

He was still alive in the early years of Abbasid Caliphate (post 750) and his best pupil was Siyat who in turn was a teacher of Ibrahim al-Mawsili.

Works
 Kitab al-Nagham (partly survived)
 Kitab al-Kian
 Kitab al-Mudjarrad Yunus
 Kitab fi 'l-Aghani (also called Diwan Yunus, according to Ibn Khordadbeh, this book contained 825 song texts by 35 singers)

References 

8th-century Iranian people
People from Medina
Poets from the Umayyad Caliphate
Persian-language poets